The Pack Is Back is the fifth full-length album by the English heavy metal band Raven, released in 1986 (see 1986 in music). It was recorded in the USA with renowned producer Eddie Kramer and features a sound more FM-friendly and commercial than any other Raven album, retaining the glam metal vein from its predecessor Stay Hard. Despite the pressure of the label to produce a commercially successful album, The Pack Is Back did not have any relevant chart entry.

Track listing

Personnel

Band members
John Gallagher - bass, vocals
Mark Gallagher - guitar, guitar synthesizers, synthesizers, vocals
Rob Hunter - drums

Additional musicians
The Uptown Horns - brass on tracks 5 and 7

Production
Eddie Kramer - producer, engineer, mixing, piano
Chris Isca - engineer
Larry Swisp - mixing
Bob Ludwig - mastering
Bob Defrin - art direction

Charts
Album - Billboard (North America)

References

1986 albums
Raven (British band) albums
Albums produced by Eddie Kramer
Atlantic Records albums